Scythris biacutella is a moth of the family Scythrididae. It was described by Bengt Å. Bengtsson in 2002. It is found in Israel, Yemen, Iran and on the Canary Islands.

References

biacutella
Moths described in 2002
Moths of the Middle East